is a passenger railway station in the town of Higashiagatsuma, Gunma Prefecture, Japan, operated by East Japan Railway Company (JR East).

Lines
Iwashima Station is a station on the Agatsuma Line, and is located 30.5 kilometres from the terminus of the line at Shibukawa Station.

Station layout
Then station consists two opposed side platforms connected by a footbridge. The station is unattended.

Platforms

History
Iwashima Station was opened on 5 August 1945 for freight only. Passenger services began from 20 November 1945. The station was absorbed into the JR East network upon the privatization of the Japanese National Railways (JNR) on 1 April 1987.

Surrounding area
 Agatsuma Canyon
 Kawanaka Onsen
 Matsunoyu Onsen

See also
 List of railway stations in Japan

External links

 

Railway stations in Gunma Prefecture
Agatsuma Line
Stations of East Japan Railway Company
Railway stations in Japan opened in 1945
Higashiagatsuma, Gunma